Clark Creek is a stream in Washington, Dodge, and Burt counties, Nebraska, in the United States. It is a tributary of the Elkhorn River.

Clark was named for M. H. Clark, a politician of the Nebraska Territory.

See also
List of rivers of Nebraska

References

Rivers of Burt County, Nebraska
Rivers of Dodge County, Nebraska
Rivers of Washington County, Nebraska
Rivers of Nebraska